Görel Partapuoli (born 25 February 1954) is a Swedish cross-country skier. She competed in three events at the 1976 Winter Olympics.

Cross-country skiing results

Olympic Games

World Championships

References

External links
 

1954 births
Living people
Swedish female cross-country skiers
Olympic cross-country skiers of Sweden
Cross-country skiers at the 1976 Winter Olympics
People from Sorsele Municipality
20th-century Swedish women